Maksim Ivanovich Azovsky (born 4 June 1986) is a Kazakhstani footballer, who currently plays for FC Zhetysu.

Career

Club
Azovsky played for the club FC Astana until summer 2007 when he was transferred to FC Alma-Ata and played than for FC Ordabasy.

On 18 February 2015, Azovsky signed for FC Zhetysu.

International
Azovsky has made 16 appearances for the Kazakhstan national football team.

Personal life
His brother, Yegor, is also a professional footballer, currently for FC Aktobe.

References

External links

1986 births
Living people
Kazakhstani footballers
Kazakhstan international footballers
Kazakhstan Premier League players
FC Ordabasy players
FC Okzhetpes players
FC Zhenis Astana players
FC Astana players
FC Taraz players
FC Akzhayik players
FC Zhetysu players
FC Spartak Semey players
Association football midfielders